John Meyer House, also known as the Mary Eckelkamp House, is a historic home located at Washington, Franklin County, Missouri. It was built about 1873, and is a -story, center entry brick dwelling on a brick foundation.  It has a front gable roof and segmental arched door and window openings.  Also on the property is a contributing one-story brick smokehouse.

It was listed on the National Register of Historic Places in 2000.

References

Houses on the National Register of Historic Places in Missouri
Houses completed in 1873
Buildings and structures in Franklin County, Missouri
National Register of Historic Places in Franklin County, Missouri